Leeway is an album by jazz trumpeter Lee Morgan released on the Blue Note label. It was recorded on April 28, 1960 and features performances by Morgan with Jackie McLean, Bobby Timmons, Paul Chambers and Art Blakey.

"The Lion and the Wolff" is dedicated to producers Alfred Lion and Francis Wolff.

Reception
The AllMusic review by Scott Yanow stated: "The music is essentially hard bop with a strong dose of soul; the very distinctive styles of the principals are the main reasons to acquire this enjoyable music.".

Track listing 
 "These Are Soulful Days" (Massey) - 9:25
 "The Lion and the Wolff" (Morgan)  9:40
 "Midtown Blues" (McLean) - 12:09
 "Nakatini Suite" (Massey) - 8:09

Personnel 
 Lee Morgan - trumpet
 Jackie McLean - alto saxophone
 Bobby Timmons - piano
 Paul Chambers - bass
 Art Blakey - drums

References

Hard bop albums
Lee Morgan albums
1960 albums
Blue Note Records albums
Albums produced by Alfred Lion
Albums recorded at Van Gelder Studio